Death Walks Behind You is the second studio album by British rock band Atomic Rooster, released on September 1970. It was their first album to receive US release, albeit in a different sleeve. It is commonly thought of as the archetypal Atomic Rooster album, recorded by the 'classic' line-up of Vincent Crane, John Du Cann and Paul Hammond. It is certainly, critically and commercially, their most successful album and often hailed as a classic of the progressive rock genre. It also produced the hit single "Tomorrow Night" (UK #11), which became one of the band's best-known songs. The album's cover features the William Blake monotype Nebuchadnezzar. Band photos were taken at Churchfield Road Cemetery, Acton W3, by former actor-turned photographer, Richard Lyon.

The title track was covered on record in 1992 by Death SS in 1991 (on their 12" "Where Have You Gone?"), Paradise Lost, in 2000 by Bigelf (on their album Money Machine) and in 2012 by Swedish death metal band NonExist.

Track listing

Personnel 
Atomic Rooster
 John Du Cann - guitars, lead vocals
 Vincent Crane - Hammond organ, piano, keyboard bass, backing vocals
 Paul Hammond - drums, percussion

Reception 
In a review special, Prog-Sphere.com writes that "though not exactly flawless, Death Walks Behind You is an impressive offering  that is  almost a must-listen for Hammond fans and anyone who likes their prog with a harder edge (though not necessarily metal). A fascinating, almost addictive album by an underrated band, whose long but chequered career ended tragically with Vincent Crane’s death in 1989."

The album reached #44 in Canada.

References 

The New Musical Express Book of Rock, 1975, Star Books, 

1970 albums
Atomic Rooster albums
Albums produced by Vincent Crane
Albums produced by John Du Cann
B&C Records albums
Progressive rock albums
Psychedelic rock albums
Elektra Records albums
Philips Records albums
Repertoire Records albums